Sphagnum warnstorfii is a species of moss belonging to the family Sphagnaceae. It is widely distributed in the north hemisphere.

In a study of the effect of the herbicide Asulam on moss growth, Sphagnum warnstorfii was shown to have intermediate sensitivity to Asulam exposure.

References

Plants described in 1888
warnstorfii